An emergent algorithm is an algorithm that exhibits emergent behavior.  In essence an emergent algorithm implements a set of simple building block behaviors that when combined exhibit more complex behaviors.  One example of this is the implementation of fuzzy motion controllers used to adapt robot movement in response to environmental obstacles.

An emergent algorithm has the following characteristics: 

 it achieves predictable global effects
 it does not require global visibility
 it does not assume any kind of centralized control
 it is self-stabilizing

Other examples of emergent algorithms and models include cellular automata, artificial neural networks and swarm intelligence systems (ant colony optimization, bees algorithm, etc.).

See also 
 Emergence
 Evolutionary computation
 Fuzzy logic
 Genetic algorithm
 Heuristic

References

Algorithm
Heuristic algorithms
Algorithms